RLSY College, Nalanda also known as Ram Lakhan Singh Yadav College, Nalanda is a degree college in Nalanda district of Bihar, India. It is affiliated with Patliputra University. The college offers senior secondary education and undergraduate degrees in arts, science and conducts some vocational courses.

History 
The college was established in 1978 by Ram Lakhan Singh Yadav. It got affiliation with Patliputra University in 2018.

Degrees and courses 
The college offers the following degrees and courses.

 Senior Secondary
 Intermediate of Arts
 Intermediate of Science
 Intermediate of Commerce 
 Bachelor's degree
 Bachelor of Arts
 Bachelor of Science

References 

Colleges affiliated to Patliputra University
1978 establishments in Bihar
Educational institutions established in 1978
Nalanda district